A list of metaphors in the English language organised alphabetically by type. A metaphor is a literary figure of speech that uses an image, story or tangible thing to represent a less tangible thing or some intangible quality or idea; e.g., "Her eyes were glistening jewels".  Metaphor may also be used for any rhetorical figures of speech that achieve their effects via association, comparison or resemblance.  In this broader sense, antithesis, hyperbole, metonymy and simile would all be considered types of metaphor. Aristotle used both this sense and the regular, current sense above.
With metaphor, unlike analogy, specific interpretations are not given explicitly.

Animals
800-pound gorilla
Albatross (metaphor)
Song bird (metaphor)
Belling the cat
Blind men and an elephant
Boiling frog
Butterfly effect
Camel's nose
Canary in the coal mine
Chicken or the egg
Dead cat bounce
Duck trick
Elephant in the room
Beating a dead horse
Four Asian Tigers
His Eye is on the Sparrow
Letting the cat out of the bag
Mama grizzly
Monkey see, monkey do
Ostrich effect
Reverse ferret
Seeing pink elephants
The Sheep and the Goats
Snake venom
Spherical cow
Throw to the wolves
Turkeys voting for Christmas
Turtles all the way down
White elephant
Who breaks a butterfly upon a wheel?
You have two cows
Shaving a cat with no hair

Body parts
Broken heart
Cold feet
Heart (symbol)

Nautical

 Taken aback, on a sailing vessel the sails were 'taken aback' when the wind was unintentionally blowing on the wrong side of the sails causing a potentially dangerous situation. Later used to indicate a difficult or unexpected situation.
 Batten down the hatches, to secure the hatch covers against ingress of water in preparation for a storm or other rough conditions. 
 Clear the decks to get everything out of the way as a warship went into action.
 Show someone the ropes to show or explain to someone how to do a task or operation. Taken from the use of ropes to orient and adjust the sails, and that each rope is belayed at a specific place.
 Sail close to the wind is to operate hazardously on very slim margins, usually applied in a financial sense. Derived from the practice  of sailing close to the direction of the oncoming wind, where a small shift in the wrong direction could set the vessel aback.
 Loaded to the gunwales 
 Back and fill
 On one's beam ends
 Awash
 Adrift
 A wide berth
 Flagship
 Unmoored
 Nail one's colors to the mast, to commit completely to a course of action, as striking the colors is no longer an option
 Flying the flag
 Plain sailing
 With flying colors - the colors was the national flag flown at sea during battle, a ship would surrender by lowering the colors and the term is now used to indicate a triumphant victory or win.
 In the doldrums
 All hands to the pumps
 Weathering a storm
 A different tack
 Swinging the lead is to avoid duty by feigning illness or injury, original a confusion between Swing the leg which related to the way dogs can run on three legs to gain sympathy and the sailor's term heaving the lead which was to take soundings.
 Left high and dry
 Three sheets to the wind, meaning "staggering drunk," refers to a ship whose sheets have come loose, causing the sails to flap uncontrolled and the ship to meander at the mercy of the elements. Also, "Three sheets in the wind, unsteady from drink."
Sun over the yardarm: This phrase is widely used, both afloat and ashore, to indicate that the time of day has been reached at which it is acceptable to have lunch or (more commonly) to have an alcoholic beverage.
 "Take soundings":  In suspected shallow waters, a crew member may have the task of repeatedly throwing into the water a lead line, or piece of lead tied to a string knotted every fathom, for the purpose of estimating the depth of the sea. This saying the nautical equivalent of "Take the lay of the land":  see how things are going, or see what people think about a proposed course of action. 
 "By and large" comes from a term for sailing a ship slightly off of the wind 
 "To the bitter end" may have originally referred to a rope fastened to the bitt, a post attached on the deck of a ship., although this etymology has been disputed

Objects
Big red button
Brass ring
Brass monkey
Bucket brigade
Chain reaction
Chinese fire drill
Cultural mosaic
Domino effect
Don't judge a book by its cover
Holy Grail
Inverted pyramid
Law of the instrument
Melting pot
Rosetta Stone
Silver bullet
Snowball effect
Soapbox
Zanata Stone
A big chair
A sailboat

People
Aunt Sally
Cassandra (metaphor)
Copernican Revolution (metaphor)
Hobson's choice
Judgment of Solomon
Mary Sue
Procrustes
Whipping boy
Aunt Flow
Uncle Sam

Places
Crossing the Rubicon
wikt:crossroads, a decision point; a turning point or opportunity to change direction, course, or goal.
Fork in the road (metaphor)
wikt:grey area, an area or topic that is not one thing or the other, or where the border between two things is fuzzy. See also wikt:fall between two stools
Ground zero
Mother lode
Plateau effect
Podunk
Point of no return
Slippery slope
Walk to Canossa

Science
Richard Honeck described three forms of scientific metaphors: "mixed scientific metaphor, the scientific metaphor theme, and the scientific metaphor that redefines a concept from a theory."

1959 Valency (linguistics), by Lucien Tesnière, from Valence (chemistry) (1789, by William Higgins)
1973 Inductor, by Deleuze and Guattari, from Electromagnetic induction (1831, by Michael Faraday)
1980 Rhizome (philosophy), by Deleuze and Guattari, from botanical rhizome

Sport
Baseball metaphors for sex
Carnoustie effect
Doing a Leeds
Face-off
False start
Jump the Gun
Media scrum
Own goal
Pole position
Political football
Par for the course

Various
Aesopian language
Apollo archetype
Bad apples
Battle of egos
Betamax
Bīja
Black-and-white dualism
Bootstrapping
Cabin fever
Cherry picking (fallacy)
China Syndrome
City on a Hill
Closeted
Coming out
Drunkard's search
Enchanted loom
Endianness
Fatted calf
Five wisdoms
Gates of horn and ivory
Gold in the mine
Gordian Knot
Greek to me
Green shoots
Hue and cry
Hungry ghost
Indra's net
Iron (metaphor)
Jungle
Kōan
Late bloomer
List of scientific metaphors
McNamara fallacy
Mindstream
Moral compass
Musical chairs
The Myth of Sisyphus
Neurathian bootstrap
Nutshell
Panopticon gaze
Pear-shaped
Post turtle
The price of milk
Ignoratio elenchi
Invincible ignorance fallacy
Red pill and blue pill
Representation (systemics)
Roof of the World
Salad days
Salt and Light
Ship of state
Son of a gun
Survival of the fittest
Teaching grandmother to suck eggs
Technical debt
Touchstone (metaphor)
Tragedy of the commons
Tunnel vision
Unmarked grave
Yin and yang
New Testament military metaphors
New Testament athletic metaphors

War
Catch-22 (logic)
Double edged sword
Dry powder
Fog of war
No-win situation
Pyrrhic victory
Saber noise
Shareholder rights plan
Shooting the messenger
Smoking gun
Texas sharpshooter fallacy
War chest
Win-win game

Lists
List of political metaphors
:Category:Political metaphors referring to people
:Category:Metaphors by reference

References

Further reading
 
 
 
 

Metaphors